The 2008 Salford City Council election took place on 1 May 2008 to elect members of Salford City Council in England. One third of the council was up for election. The Labour Party lost six seats but stayed in overall control of the council. Overall turnout was 31.3%.

The composition of the Council following the 2008 elections:

Election result

|}

Ward results

Barton ward

Boothstown And Ellenbrook ward

Broughton ward

Cadishead ward

Claremont ward

Eccles ward

Irlam ward

Irwell Riverside ward

Kersal ward

Langworthy ward

Little Hulton ward

Ordsall ward

Pendlebury ward

Swinton North ward

Swinton South ward

Walkden North ward

Walkden South ward

Weaste & Seedley ward

Winton ward

Worsley ward

References

Salford Council election, 2008 - nominations
Salford Councillors

2008
2008 English local elections
2000s in Greater Manchester